The BMW 4 Series is a range of compact executive cars manufactured by BMW since 2013. The 4 Series was created when BMW spun off the 2-door models (coupé and convertible) of the 3 Series into a separate series. The 4 Series is currently in its second generation.

The original 4 Series concept car was unveiled in January 2013 at the North American International Auto Show in Detroit, Michigan. Both generations have been produced in the coupé, convertible and 5-door liftback (marketed as "Gran Coupé") body styles. The 4 series body style is very similar to that of the all electric BMW i4.

The engines available for the first generation were turbocharged inline-3, inline-4 and inline-6 engines fueled by petrol or diesel. For the second generation, a plug-in hybrid powertrain was introduced. As per the equivalent 3 Series generations, the 4 Series' drivetrain layout is rear-wheel drive or all-wheel drive ("xDrive").

The BMW M4 is the high-performance version of the 4 Series. The first generation of the M4 is called the F82/F83 and uses the same turbocharged inline-six petrol engine as the F80/F81 M3.

First generation (F32/F33/F36; 2013)

The first generation of the 4 Series consists of the following body styles:
 2-door coupé (F32 model code)
 2-door convertible (F33 model code)
 4-door liftback (F36 model code; marketed as the 4 Series Gran Coupé)

This generation has been produced since 2014 and is often collectively referred to as the F32. The F32 was introduced as the successor to the E92/E93 coupé/convertible models of the fifth-generation 3 Series range. The F32 is produced alongside - and shares many features with - the F30 3 Series. As with the F30 3 Series range, the F32/F33/F36 is powered by turbocharged petrol and diesel engines with 3 cylinders (petrol only), 4 cylinders, and 6 cylinders.

The high performance F82/F83 M4 models were introduced in early 2014. They are powered by the S55 turbocharged straight-six engine.

Second generation (G22/G23/G26; 2020)
The second generation of the 4 Series consists of the following body styles:
 2-door coupé (G22 model code)
 2-door convertible (G23 model code)
 5-door liftback (G26 model code; marketed as the 4 Series Gran Coupé)

This generation was launched in June 2020 and is currently in production. The G22/G23/G26 will be produced alongside - and shares many features with - the G20 3 Series. As with the G20 3 Series range, the G22/G23/G26 will be powered by turbocharged petrol and diesel engines.

Unlike its predecessor, the new 4 Series has a significant departure in design from the 3 Series in order to distinguish between the two models and to move the 4 Series upscale. The most notable of the design changes is the large kidney grille at the front which was inspired by the 1930s BMW 328.

Awards 
In January 2021, the BMW 420i M Sport (M Sport Pro Package) was named Coupé of the Year by What Car? magazine. What Car? awarded the 4 Series Coupé five stars out of five in its review of the car.

References

4 Series
Cars introduced in 2014
2020s cars
Compact executive cars
Coupés
Convertibles
Hatchbacks
Sports sedans